Captain Edmund Moubray Lyons (27 October 1819 – 23 June 1855) was an officer of the Royal Navy. He served during the early nineteenth century, and was mortally wounded while commanding  in the Crimean War.

Early life
Edmund Lyons was born on 27 October 1819. He was the second son of Edmund Lyons, 1st Baron Lyons and Augusta Louisa (née Rogers). His elder brother, whom he predeceased, was Richard Lyons, 1st Viscount Lyons.

Royal Navy career

Early career
Edmund entered the Royal Naval College on 10 July 1829. He passed his examinations in 1838, and went out to the Far East where he served during the First Opium War. He was present at the operations at Bocca Tigris, seeing action at the Battle of the Bogue and the Battle of Canton. For his good service he was promoted to lieutenant on 10 June 1841. He was then appointed as an additional lieutenant aboard the 120-gun , then serving in the Mediterranean. Howe was at this time under the command of Captain Robert Smart, as the flagship of Francis Mason, then the second-in-command of the Mediterranean Fleet. From Howe Lyons moved to the 92-gun  on 1 March 1842, then under the command of Captain Robert Maunsell.

Lyons' next ship was the 110-gun , which he joined on 11 January 1844 as an additional lieutenant. Queen was at this time in the Mediterranean as the flagship of Vice-Admiral Sir Edward Owen, and was commanded by John Baker Porter Hay. Lyons's time aboard Queen was short-lived, he was appointed to the 24-gun , under Captain Lord Clarence Paget, on 15 April 1844. Lyons joined the 26-gun  on 19 June 1845 and served under Captain William Nugent Glascock. He was then appointed as first lieutenant of the 16-gun , under Captain Harry Edmund Edgell, on 10 April 1846. He was promoted to commander on 9 November 1846.

Command
Lyons then took command of his first ship, the 16-gun , on 7 June 1848 and served in the East Indies. He was promoted to captain on 4 October 1849, and then took command of the wooden screw sloop  on her commissioning at Sheerness on 25 February 1854. He served initially in the White Sea during the Crimean War as part of Sir Erasmus Ommanney's squadron, but then was sent to the Black Sea.

Death

Lyons was involved in a night attack on the batteries at Sebastopol on 17 June 1855, during which he was mortally wounded. He died ten days later, on 27 June 1855 in Tarabya (known to the British as Therapia) on the Bosphorus. The officers and crew of Miranda paid for a memorial to him in St Paul's Cathedral, London. The same officers also erected a gravestone in memory of Lyons which now rests in Haydarpaşa Cemetery in Üsküdar, Istanbul.

Literary appearance
He appears as a character in the books The Valiant Sailors, Hazard of Huntress, and other works by V.A. Stuart.

See also
Lyons family

Sources

1819 births
1855 deaths
British military personnel killed in the Crimean War
Royal Navy officers
Royal Navy personnel of the Crimean War
Royal Navy personnel of the First Opium War
Younger sons of barons